Sean Dolan (born February 11, 1988) is an American professional ice hockey player. He last played with the Lausitzer Füchse of the German DEL2 league.

Playing career

Dolan attended the University of Wisconsin where he played four seasons (2007-2011) of college hockey with the NCAA Division I Wisconsin Badgers men's ice hockey team, scoring 42 points and registering 118 penalty minutes in 143 career games.

Dolan made his professional debut during the 2010–11 season playing in the ECHL with the South Carolina Stingrays. He also started the 2011–12 campaign with the Stingrays, but after 32 ECHL games Dolan was called up to join the Charlotte Checkers of the AHL.

On July 30, 2013, Dolan was extended by the Checkers on a one-year deal for his third season with the club.

A free agent, Dolan agreed to try out with the Chicago Wolves at their 2014 training camp on September 30, 2014. After his release, Dolan opted to return to the South Carolina Stingrays on a one-year contract on October 7, 2014.

On August 29, 2015, Dolan left the Stingrays organization as a free agent and signed his first contract abroad, agreeing to a one-year deal with German club, Lausitzer Füchse of the DEL2. He was waived in mid-December 2015.

Career statistics

References

External links

1988 births
Living people
American men's ice hockey centers
Cedar Rapids RoughRiders players
Charlotte Checkers (2010–) players
Chicago Steel players
Florida Everblades players
Ice hockey people from Missouri
Indiana Ice players
People from Chesterfield, Missouri
South Carolina Stingrays players
Wisconsin Badgers men's ice hockey players